Port Vale Football Club is an English professional association football club based in Burslem, Stoke-on-Trent, Staffordshire, who play in , as of the end of the  season. After becoming one of the more prominent football clubs in Staffordshire, Burslem Port Vale were invited to become founder members of the Football League Second Division in 1892. They spent 13 non-consecutive seasons in the division, punctuated by two seasons in the Midland League, before they resigned due to financial difficulties and entered liquidation in 1907. The name of Port Vale continued in the North Staffordshire Federation League, and this new club were successful enough to be reinstated into the Football League in October 1919. They spent 16 non-consecutive seasons in the Second Division, punctuated by them winning the Third Division North title in 1929–30, before dropping back into the third tier for a much longer stay at the end of the 1935–36 campaign. The 1953–54 season saw manager Freddie Steele's "Iron Curtain" defence win both a Third Division North title and a semi-final place in the FA Cup. They failed to build on this success however, though went on to finish as champions of the first ever Fourth Division season under Norman Low's stewardship in 1958–59.

The club had little success throughout the 1960s and 1970s, despite being briefly managed by Stanley Matthews, and in fact were forced to apply for re-election after breaking FA rules on illegal payments in 1968. Gordon Lee guided the club to promotion back to the Third Division the following season, where they would remain until relegation at the end of the 1977–78 campaign. John McGrath steered the club to promotion in 1982–83, though he departed after relegation became inevitable the following season. His assistant, John Rudge, stepped up to become the club's longest-serving and most successful manager, leading the club from 1983 to 1999. Under his leadership Port Vale won promotions in 1985–86, 1988–89 and 1993–94, lifted the League Trophy in 1993 and reached a post-war record finish of eighth in the second tier in the 1996–97 season. After Rudge's reign ended the club entered a decline, slipping into the fourth tier whilst twice entering administration in 2003 and 2012. The decline was arrested when Norman Smurthwaite brought the club out of administration in 2012 and manager Micky Adams achieved automatic promotion from League Two in the 2012–13 season, though they were relegated back into League Two at the end of the 2016–17 season after a failed experiment with a continental staff and playing style. Carol Shanahan bought the club in 2019 and manager Darrell Clarke secured promotion out of the League Two play-offs at the end of the 2021–22 season.

First team matches were recorded for the first time in 1882, meaning records go back over 140 years, friendlies are not included in this data (including goal tallies). As of the 2022–23 season, Port Vale have never played top-flight football, they have spent 41 seasons in the second tier, 47 seasons in the third tier, 23 seasons in the fourth tier of the Football League, as well as 16 seasons in non-League football. No team has played more second tier seasons or Football League seasons in total (111) without ever reaching the top-flight.

Key

Key to colours and symbols:

Key to league record:
P – Games played
W – Games won
D – Games drawn
L – Games lost
F – Goals for
A – Goals against
Pts – Points gained
Pos – Final position
Ave – Average home league attendance

Key to rounds:
DNE – Did not enter
P – Preliminaries
1Q – First qualifying round
2Q – Second qualifying round, etc.
R1 – First round, etc.
QF – Quarter-final
SF – Semi-final
GS – Group stage
AQF – Area quarter-finals, etc.

Seasons

Notes

References
General

Specific

Port Vale F.C.
Seasons